Tsaukambo or Tsakwambo is one of the Greater Awyu languages of West Papua.

References

Hughes, Jock. 2009. Upper Digul Survey. SIL International.

Languages of western New Guinea
Becking–Dawi languages